Eliot Schrefer (born November 25, 1978) is an American and British author of both adult and young adult fiction, and a two-time finalist for the National Book Award in Young People's Literature.  Schrefer's first novel Glamorous Disasters was published by Simon & Schuster in 2006.  He is most known for his young adult novels Endangered (2012) and Threatened (2014), which are survival stories featuring young people and great apes. He is currently on the faculty of the Creative Writing MFA Program at Fairleigh Dickinson University.

Career
In reviewing his novel Endangered, The New York Times praised the depth of his characters, saying "As riveting as the action is, it’s the nuanced portraits of the characters, human and ape, that make the story so deeply affecting."  Dennis Abrams of Publishing Perspectives, also discussed in his review of Threatened, the way in which Schrefer "even makes his chimpanzees ... into living breathing characters."

In drawing parallels between the bonobo apes and human characters in these novels, Schrefer says that writing about the bonobos "allowed me to address more nakedly the feelings—jealousy, loyalty, anger, sorrow—that we all experience."

Schrefer withdrew from the 2021 Plum Creek Literacy Festival at Concordia University Nebraska after observing that books with LGBT characters, including his book The Darkness Outside Us, had been excluded from the festival and that the religious University had a discriminatory policy toward LGBT students. Other authors withdrew following Schrefer, and the festival was cancelled.

The Darkness Outside Us, an LGBT young adult science fiction novel by Schrefer, was published in 2021 by Harper Collins.

Personal life 
Born in Chicago to a British mother and an American father, Schrefer identifies as gay.

List of works

The Ape Quartet
Endangered (Scholastic, 2012)
Threatened (Scholastic, 2014)
Rescued (Scholastic, 2016)
Orphaned (Scholastic, September 25, 2018)

The Lost Rainforest
Mez's Magic (Katherine Tegen Books, January 2, 2018)
Gogi's Gambit (Jaden Tegen Books, February 5, 2019)
Rumi's Riddle (Katherine Tegen Books, February 4, 2020)

Spirit Animals
Spirit Animals book 6: Rise and Fall (Scholastic, 2014)
Spirit Animals (Fall of the Beasts) book 1: Immortal Guardians (Scholastic, 2015)

Other work
Glamorous Disasters (Simon & Schuster, 2006)
The New Kid (Simon & Schuster, 2007)
Hack the SAT (Gotham Books, 2008)
The School for Dangerous Girls (Scholastic, 2009)
The Deadly Sister (Scholastic, 2010)
Greek Fantasy Novel (Scholastic, 2011)
The Darkness Outside Us (Harper Collins, 2021)
Queer Ducks (and Other Animals) (Harper Collins, 2022)

References

External links
 
 

1978 births
Living people
American male novelists
Harvard University alumni
Writers from Chicago
Novelists from Illinois
American gay writers
LGBT people from Illinois
American LGBT novelists
21st-century LGBT people